Gabriela S. Schlau-Cohen is a Thomas D. and Virginia W. Cabot Career Development Associate Professor at MIT in the Department of Chemistry.

Education and career 
Schlau-Cohen received a BS with honors in chemical physics from Brown University in 2003. She completed her PhD in chemistry in 2011 at the University of California, Berkeley, where she worked with Professor Graham R. Fleming as an American Association of University Women (AAUW) fellow. From 2011 to 2014, Schlau-Cohen was a Center for Molecular Analysis and Design (CMAD) postdoctoral fellow at Stanford University. She worked with Professor W.E. Moerner and Professor Ed Solomon on oxidative enzyme mechanisms, employing “time-dependent, single-molecule spectroscopy and steady-state ensemble measurements to study the kinetics of electron transfer in Fet3p, the MCO [multi-copper oxidase ] responsible for iron uptake in yeast.”

In 2015, Schlau-Cohen joined the faculty of MIT as an assistant professor and was promoted to associate professor on July 1, 2020. Her research group at MIT, also known as the Schlau-Cohen Lab, is at the intersection of physical and biological chemistry. The lab focuses on using “a combination of single-molecule and ultrafast spectroscopies to explore the energetic and structural dynamics of biological systems.” Schlau-Cohen’s team works to “develop and apply tools to uncover the conformational and photophysical mechanisms of photosynthetic light harvesting and its regulation.”

Schlau-Cohen has served as Associate Director of the Bioinspired Light Escalated Chemistry Energy Frontier Research Center (BioLEC EFRC), a member of the Executive Committee of the APS Division of Laser Science, and as a STEM ambassador for the American Association of University Women.

Awards and honors 

 2020 – The Journal of Physical Chemistry and PHYS Division Lectureship Award
 2020 – Camille Dreyfus Teacher-Scholar Award
 2020 – James L. Kinsey Memorial Lecturer at Rice University
 2018 – Scialog Fellow for Chemical Machinery of the Cell
 2018 – CIFAR Bio-inspired Solar Energy Fellow
 2018 – Sloan Research Fellow in Chemistry
 2017 – NIH Director’s New Innovator Award
 2016 – CIFAR Azrieli Global Scholar
 2016 – Beckman Young Investigator
 2015 – Smith Family Award for Excellence in Biomedical Research
 2013 – Postdoctoral Research Award, ACS PHYS Division
 2010–2011 – American Fellowship, American Association of University Women
 2007 – Abramson Graduate Scholarship, University of California, Berkeley  
 1999 – Esther Poncz Memorial Scholarship, Children’s Hospital of Philadelphia

Selected publications

References

External links 

Massachusetts Institute of Technology School of Science faculty
American women chemists
Brown University alumni
University of California, Berkeley alumni
Living people
Year of birth missing (living people)
American women academics
21st-century American women